Summer Holiday is a soundtrack album by Cliff Richard and The Shadows to the film of the same name. It is their second film soundtrack album and Richard's eighth album overall. The album topped the UK Albums Chart for 14 weeks. Three singles from the album were released. Before the album release both "The Next Time" and "Bachelor Boy" (A- and B-side respectively) had already been hits. This was followed by "Summer Holiday" and lastly "Foot Tapper" (by the Shadows). All three singles topped the UK Singles Chart.

Rare Release
A "special edition" double-album (limited to 80 copies) was given to the cast and crew of the movie and has since become very collectible, with an original selling for £498 in 2010.

Track listing
Side one
"Seven Days to a Holiday" (Cliff Richard, A.B.S. Orchestra, The Michael Sammes Singers)
 "Summer Holiday" (Cliff Richard and the Shadows, The Norrie Paramor Strings)
"Let Us Take You for a Ride" (Cliff Richard, A.B.S. Orchestra, The Michael Sammes Singers)
"Les Girls" (The Shadows)
"Round and Round" (The Shadows)
"Foot Tapper" (The Shadows)
"Stranger in Town" (Cliff Richard, A.B.S. Orchestra)
"Orlando's Mime" (A.B.S. Orchestra)
Side two
"Bachelor Boy" (Cliff Richard and the Shadows, The Michael Sammes Singers)
"A Swingin' Affair" (Cliff Richard, Grazina Frame, A.B.S. Orchestra)
"Really Waltzing" (Cliff Richard, A.B.S. Orchestra, The Michael Sammes Singers)
"All At Once" (Cliff Richard, A.B.S. Orchestra)
"Dancing Shoes" (Cliff Richard and the Shadows)
"Yugoslav Wedding" (A.B.S. Orchestra)
"The Next Time" (Cliff Richard and the Shadows, The Norrie Paramor Strings)
"Big News" (Cliff Richard and the Shadows)

Personnel
Cliff Richard and the Shadows
Cliff Richard – lead vocals
Hank Marvin – lead guitar
Bruce Welch – rhythm guitar
Brian 'Licorice' Locking – bass guitar
Brian Bennett – drums

Chart performance

References

Cliff Richard albums
The Shadows albums
1963 soundtrack albums
Albums produced by Norrie Paramor
EMI Columbia Records soundtracks
Musical film soundtracks